The Velocity Model 173 SE (Standard Elite) is an entry level canard pusher aircraft from Velocity Aircraft.
The four seat, rear engine aircraft may be powered by a  Lycoming IO-320 or a  Lycoming IO-360 engine.

Variants
Velocity SE-FG
Fixed landing gear version, 88 completed and flown by December 2011.
Velocity SE-RG
Retractable landing gear version, 180 completed and flown by December 2011.
 Rocket Racer 
 The  Mark-I X-Racer, a rocketplane design for the Rocket Racing League built on a Velocity SE airframe. It was built by XCOR Aerospace with an XCOR XR-4K14 1,500 lb thrust rocket engine fuelled by LOX and kerosene.  This rocket-powered aircraft flew several demonstration flights at the 2008 EAA AirVenture Oshkosh air show.

Specifications (SE-RG IO-360)

See also 
 Velocity XL
 Raptor Aircraft Raptor
 Rutan Long-EZ
 Rutan VariEze
 Rutan Defiant
 Berkut aircraft
 Cozy MK IV

References

External links 

 Velocity aircraft

1990s United States civil utility aircraft
Canard aircraft
Homebuilt aircraft
Single-engined pusher aircraft
Mid-wing aircraft